Presquile National Wildlife Refuge in the U.S. state of Virginia is one of four refuges that comprise the Eastern Virginia Rivers National Wildlife Refuge Complex. It is managed by the United States Fish and Wildlife Service. It is located in the easternmost part of Chesterfield County, northeast of Hopewell.

In 1953, A. D Williams, a Richmond tobacco magnate, willed a parcel of land called Presquile to the Virginia Commission of Game and Inland Fisheries for use as a wildlife refuge. Previously Presquile had functioned as a farm and plantation. The main house at Presquile was built in the 1760s but was demolished in 1964.

Established to protect habitat for wintering waterfowl and other migratory birds, Presquile is an important component in the network of refuges on and around the Chesapeake Bay, the largest estuary in the United States. Presquile historically provided important habitat for wintering Canada geese that breed along James Bay in eastern Canada. The refuge is also home to nesting and roosting bald eagles.

References

External links 
 Presquile National Wildlife Refuge
 

National Wildlife Refuges in Virginia
Wetlands of Virginia
Protected areas of Chesterfield County, Virginia
Protected areas established in 1953
1953 establishments in Virginia
Landforms of Chesterfield County, Virginia